Beth Hannah McNeill (born 10 November 1982) is a New Zealand former cricketer who played as a right-arm medium bowler and right-handed batter. She appeared in 23 One Day Internationals and 2 Twenty20 Internationals for New Zealand between 2004 and 2009. She played domestic cricket for Otago and Canterbury.

References

External links

1982 births
Living people
Cricketers from Wellington City
New Zealand women cricketers
New Zealand women Twenty20 International cricketers
New Zealand women One Day International cricketers
Otago Sparks cricketers
Canterbury Magicians cricketers